James Shannon Larkin (born April 24, 1967) is an American musician, best known as the drummer of rock band Godsmack. He replaced the previous drummer Tommy Stewart in June 2002. Prior to Godsmack, he was a member of Amen, Candlebox, Ugly Kid Joe, and Souls at Zero (formerly Wrathchild America).

Shannon played drums for Godsmack for their albums Faceless, IV, The Other Side EP, The Oracle, 1000hp, When Legends Rise, and their latest album Lighting Up The Sky.

Career
Larkin has been playing drums since the age of ten.

He formed Wrathchild America in 1978, recording two albums for Atlantic Records before being dropped by the label. The group disbanded and later reformed as Souls at Zero, signing with Energy Rekords and releasing an eponymous debut album that was well received by critics. He went on to record two albums with Ugly Kid Joe and two more with Amen.

He joined Godsmack in 2003, replacing departing drummer Tommy Stewart. He has since appeared on their albums  Faceless, IV, The Other Side, The Oracle, 1000hp, When Legends Rise.

His numerous side projects have included hardcore punk and thrash metal band Kiddie Porn with fellow Wrathchild guitarist Jay Abbene and bassist John "Tumor" Fahnestock, MF Pitbulls with members of Snot, and The Apocalypse Blues Revival with Tony Rombola.

He has appeared as a session musician on such albums as Strait Up by Snot and Glenn Tipton's Baptizm of Fire. He has played for Vanilla Ice, Glassjaw, and Stone Sour.

He was featured on the Behind the Player series.

Personal life
Larkin is a koi and turtle enthusiast and keeps multiple koi and turtles at his home.

Tattoos
Larkin has been tattooed by artists all over the world. In addition to a full sleeve on his left arm and tattoos on his right arm, Larkin has Amen tattooed across his knuckles and a hand ripping into the skin on his stomach.

Discography

Wrathchild America
Climbin' the Walls (1989)
3-D (1991)

Souls at Zero
Souls at Zero (1993)
Six-T-Six EP (1994)

Ugly Kid Joe
Menace to Sobriety (1995)
Motel California (1996)
The Very Best of Ugly Kid Joe: As Ugly as It Gets (1998)
Stairway to Hell (2012)
Uglier Than They Used ta Be (2015)

Glen Tipton
 Baptizm of Fire

Amen
Amen (1999)
We Have Come for Your Parents (2001)
Death Before Musick (2004)

Candlebox
Happy Pills (1998)

Snot
Strait Up (2000)

Godsmack
Faceless (2003)
The Other Side (2004)
IV (2006)
Good Times, Bad Times.... 10 Years of Godsmack (2007)
The Oracle (2010)
1000hp (2014)
When Legends Rise (2018)
Lighting Up The Sky (2023)

Another Animal
Another Animal (2007)

As session musician
30/30-150 by Stone Sour
Hard to Swallow by Vanilla Ice
Worship and Tribute by Glassjaw
Massive Grooves... by Poundhound (aka Doug Pinnick of King's X)  1998

The Apocalypse Blues Revival
The Apocalypse Blues Revue (2016)
The Shape of Blues to Come (2018)

References

External links

 Shannon Larkin on Instagram
 

1967 births
Living people
Candlebox members
Godsmack members
Ugly Kid Joe members
American blues drummers
American heavy metal drummers
American rock drummers
Musicians from Chicago
People from Martinsburg, West Virginia
20th-century American drummers
American male drummers
Amen (American band) members
Snot (band) members
Wrathchild America members
Souls at Zero (band) members
Another Animal members